The Green Room is the fourth studio album by American recording artist Vivian Green. It was released by E1 Music on October 9, 2012 in the United States. The album reached the top twenty on Billboards Top R&B/Hip-Hop Albums chart.

Track listing

Charts

References

External links
 

2012 albums
Vivian Green albums
Pop albums by American artists